William Joseph Reide  (October 9, 1873 – October 14, 1915) was a professional baseball player. He played from 1896 to 1904.

Reide was a native of Cleveland, Ohio, where he also died and was buried.

External links

1873 births
1915 deaths
Major League Baseball pitchers
Baseball players from Cleveland
New York Giants (NL) players
Milwaukee Brewers (1901) players
Brooklyn Superbas players
St. Louis Browns players
19th-century baseball players
Saginaw Alerts players
Jackson Jaxons players
Findlay Sluggers players
Grand Rapids Gold Bugs players
Syracuse Stars (minor league baseball) players
Springfield Ponies players
Quincy Bluebirds players
Milwaukee Brewers (minor league) players
Grand Rapids Bob-o-links players
Milwaukee Creams players
Louisville Colonels (minor league) players
Indianapolis Indians players
Oakland Oaks (baseball) players
Oakland Oaks (baseball) managers